Sailor of Fortune is a 1955 British-Canadian TV series starring Lorne Greene. Several episodes were directed by John Guillermin.

It was filmed at New Elstree Studios and Nettlefold Studios, both near London.  Greene would go on to star in the popular American TV western series Bonanza.

References

External links

Sailor of Fortune at CTVA

1955 Canadian television series debuts
1955 Canadian television series endings
Canadian adventure television series
British adventure television series
Nautical television series
Black-and-white British television shows
Black-and-white Canadian television shows
Television shows shot at New Elstree Studios